Piyawit Janput (born 4 March 1992) is a Thai professional footballer who plays as a left-back. He played from 2014 to 2016 in the Thai Premier League for BBCU, Chainat Hornbill and Singhtarua.

References

External links
 https://www.livesoccer888.com/players/Piyawit-Janput
 http://player.7mth.com/338660/index.shtml
 https://www.smmsport.com/reader/news/254552

1992 births
Living people
Piyawit Janput
Piyawit Janput
Association football defenders
Piyawit Janput
Piyawit Janput
Piyawit Janput
Piyawit Janput